World-Check is a database of Politically Exposed Persons (PEPs) and heightened risk individuals and organizations, used around the world to help to identify and manage financial, regulatory and reputational risk. World Check formed part of the Thomson Reuters Risk Management Solutions suite before being transferred to Refinitiv after a merger deal with The Blackstone Group in October 2018.

The creation of the database was in response to legislation aimed at reducing the incidence of financial crimes. To begin with, World-Check's intelligence was used by banks and financial institutions as a comprehensive solution for assessing, managing and remediating risk. However, as legislation has become increasingly complex and its reach has become increasingly global, the demand for such intelligence has grown beyond the financial sector to include organisations from all sectors.

Research coverage 

World-Check's research team monitors emerging risks in more than 60 languages, covering over 240 countries and territories worldwide. All information used is in the public domain and research analysts profile individuals and entities using open-source research methodology (OSINT) while adhering to strict protocol such as that laid down by the Data Protection Act (UK).

A team of analysts correlates sanction and embargo lists from around the world, including lists such as OFAC, UK HMT, EU, OSFI, FATF and the Australian DFAT. Regulatory and enforcement lists are monitored as well as lists of debarred and banned parties. Specific areas of interest, such as terrorism, organised crime and the Middle East, are covered by specialist teams.

History

World-Check was founded in 2000 by David Leppan and Laura Aboli and registered in London, to address the risk mitigation requirements of the banking community. It provides information to help businesses comply with regulations and identify potential financial crime. World-Check serves the know your customer (KYC) and third-party screening needs of large firms, and helps businesses comply with anti-money laundering and countering financing of terrorism legislation.

In 2008, World-Check launched Country-Check, an index which ranks over 240 countries and territories worldwide in terms of risk. A statistical algorithm is used to aggregate various information sources across political, financial and criminal factors which quantifies risk attached to customers and transactions according to their country of origin. Based on statistics, Country-Check provides intelligence for informed decision-making, useful for mergers and acquisitions, security of supply chain, cross border expansion and exploration, and production.

In 2009, World-Check acquired IntegraScreen, a provider of enhanced due diligence reporting services. IntegraScreen reports are used when a detailed background check on any entity or individual is required, and research can be carried out no matter where the location.

In 2011, World-Check received independent assurance under the International Standard on Assurance Engagements ISAE 3000.

In 2011, Thomson Reuters acquired World-Check as a key component of their governance, risk management and compliance unit. In October 2018, Thomson Reuters closed a deal with The Blackstone Group, and as a result of this merger World-Check is owned by the new company, Refinitiv.

Partnerships
World-Check is used by several financial firms to meet due diligence and Know-Your-Customer (KYC) compliance needs:

 Lloyd's of London has used World-Check for its due diligence and KYC compliance needs since 2008.
Maecenas, a blockchain-based art marketplace, uses World-Check to mitigate the risk of financial crime and meet due diligence requirements.
 SAI Global, a risk management, standards compliance and information business, uses World-Check as a third-party risk management partner.
Aravo Solutions, a third-party risk management services company, has collaborated on a joint offering with World-Check to retrieve company information directly.
The World-Check Customer Risk Screener is an application available on the Salesforce AppExchange, which allows Salesforce users to access World-Check's risk intelligence database to reveal risks associated with customers, leads or accounts.

Controversies

Leak of Database and Security Compromises
In a Reddit post, a user declared that he had acquired a copy of the World-Check database with information up to 2014. This leak was possible due to an incomplete assessment of the security, and was downloaded through the website Shodan, a search engine that lets users find specific types of computers connected to the internet using a variety of filters.

False claims
In 2017, World-Check admitted that the Palestine Solidarity Campaign (PSC) should never have been placed on their database at all, and specifically, should not have been associated with terrorism, stressing that there were no grounds to suggest that PSC were either associated with terrorism related activity, or that the organisation presented any kind of financial risk. The PSC and World-Check have reached an agreement to address the harm done to the reputation of the PSC and its chair, Mr. Hugh Lanning, and to resolve the matters between them arising from that profile.

In 2017, World-Check agreed to pay compensation and apologize to Finsbury Park Mosque after a false claim that it had a current association with terrorism.

In 2017, Quilliam founder Maajid Nawaz was found to have been listed as a terrorist in World-Check following an investigation by Vice. Thomson Reuters subsequently removed his name from the list, apologized and paid an undisclosed amount in damages as part of the settlement following the threat of a lawsuit by Nawaz.

See also 
Suisse secrets
World Leaders

References

External links 
 World-Check by Refinitiv

Financial services companies established in 2000
Open-source intelligence
British companies established in 2000
Political databases
Companies based in London